1997 in sports describes the year's events in world sport.

Alpine skiing
 Alpine Skiing World Cup
 Men's overall season champion: Luc Alphand, France
 Women's overall season champion: Pernilla Wiberg, Sweden

American football
 Super Bowl XXXI – the Green Bay Packers (NFC) won 35–21 over the New England Patriots (AFC)
Location: Superdome
Attendance: 72,301
MVP: Desmond Howard, KR (Green Bay)
 Sugar Bowl (1996 season):
 The Florida Gators won 52–20 over the Florida State Seminoles to win the national championship
 October 18 – Liz Heaston becomes the first woman to both play and score in a college football game

Artistic gymnastics
 World Artistic Gymnastics Championships –
 Women's all–around champion: Svetlana Khorkina, Russian
 Women's team competition champion: Romania
 Women's vault champion: Simona Amânar, Romania
 Women's uneven bars champion: Svetlana Khorkina, Russian
 Women's balance beam champion: Gina Gogean, Romania
 Women's floor exercise champion: Gina Gogean, Romania
 Men's all-around champion: Ivan Ivankov, Belarus
 Men's team competition champion: China
 Men's vault champion: Sergei Fedorchenko, Kazakhstan
 Men's still rings champion: Yuri Chechi, Italy
 Men's floor exercise champion: Alexei Nemov, Russian
 Men's parallel bars champion: Zhang Jinjing, China
 Men's pommel horse champion: Valery Belenky, Germany
 Men's horizontal bar champion: Jani Tanskanen, Finland

Association football

 Champions League – Borussia Dortmund beat Juventus F.C. 3–1	
 UEFA Cup – FC Schalke 04 beat F.C. Internazionale Milano 	
 Copa Libertadores – Cruzeiro Esporte Clube beat Sporting Cristal

Athletics
 August – 1997 World Championships in Athletics held at the Olympic Stadium, Athens, Greece.

Australian football
 Australian Football League
 Port Adelaide join the league
 Adelaide Crows win Grand Final for the first time – downing St. Kilda on the last day in September

Baseball
 June 12 – Interleague play begins in baseball, ending a 126-year tradition of separating the major leagues until the World Series.
 World Series – Florida Marlins won 4 games to 3 over the Cleveland Indians. The Series MVP was Liván Hernández, Florida

Basketball
 NCAA Men's Basketball Championship –
 Arizona Wildcats win 84–79 in overtime over the Kentucky Wildcats. This is Arizona's first NCAA title in men's basketball.
 NBA Finals –
 Chicago Bulls earn their second repeat of the decade as they beat the Utah Jazz 4 games to 2 (see Steve Kerr).
 WNBA Finals (inaugural WNBA season):
 Houston Comets defeat the New York Liberty in one game playoff series.
 National Basketball League (Australia) Finals:
 Melbourne Tigers defeated the South East Melbourne Magic 2–1 in the best–of–three final series.

Boxing
 January 18 – Oscar De La Hoya maintained his World Boxing Council super lightweight title in with a 12–round unanimous decision over Miguel Ángel González in Las Vegas, Nevada.
 May 13 – death of Eduard Zakharov (22), Russian boxer
 June 28 – Mike Tyson bites off a piece of the ear of Evander Holyfield in the third round of their WBA Heavyweight title fight, getting disqualified by referee Mills Lane.
 July 9 – Mike Tyson's boxing license is suspended for at least a year and he is fined $3 million for biting Evander Holyfield's ear in a televised match.
 October 18 to October 26 – World Amateur Boxing Championships held in Budapest, Hungary

Canadian football
 Grey Cup – Toronto Argonauts won 47–23 over the Saskatchewan Roughriders
 Vanier Cup – UBC Thunderbirds win 39–23 over the Ottawa Gee-Gees

Cricket
 The Ashes – Australia win the six test series 3–2
 ICC Trophy – Bangladesh
 Women's Cricket World Cup – Australia beat New Zealand by five wickets
 County Championship (England and Wales) won by Glamorgan

Cycling
 Giro d'Italia won by Ivan Gotti of Italy
 Tour de France – Jan Ullrich of Germany
 UCI Road World Championships – Men's road race – Laurent Brochard of France

Dogsled racing
 Iditarod Trail Sled Dog Race Champion
 Martin Buser won with lead dogs: Blondie & Fearless

Field hockey
 Men's Champions Trophy: Germany
 Women's Champions Trophy: Australia

Figure skating
 World Figure Skating Championships –
 Men's champion: Elvis Stojko, Canada
 Ladies' champion: Tara Lipinski, United States
 Pairs' champions: Mandy Wötzel & Ingo Steuer, Germany
 Ice dancing champions: Oksana Grishuk / Evgeny Platov, Russia

Floorball 
 Women's World Floorball Championships
 Champion: Sweden
 European Cup
 Men's champion: Fornudden IB
 Women's champion: Högdalens AIS

Gaelic Athletic Association
 Camogie
 All-Ireland Camogie Champion: Cork
 National Camogie League: Cork
 Gaelic football
 All-Ireland Senior Football Championship – Kerry 0–13 died Mayo 1–7
 National Football League – Kerry 3–7 died Cork 1–8
 Ladies' Gaelic football
 All-Ireland Senior Football Champion: Monaghan
 National Football League: Waterford
 Hurling
 All-Ireland Senior Hurling Championship – Clare 0–20 died Tipperary 2–13
 National Hurling League – Limerick 1–12 beat Galway 1–9

Golf
Men's professional
 Masters Tournament – Tiger Woods
 U.S. Open – Ernie Els
 British Open – Justin Leonard
 PGA Championship – Davis Love III
 PGA Tour money leader – Tiger Woods – $2,066,833
 PGA Tour Player of the Year – Tiger Woods
 PGA Tour Rookie of the Year – Stewart Cink
 Senior PGA Tour money leader – Hale Irwin – $2,343,364
 Ryder Cup – Europe won 14½–13½ over the United States in team golf.
 Tiger Woods creates an uproar with his record 12-shot victory at the Masters, and becomes the first Masters winner of African-American descent. He set the record for the lowest to-par score of −18, and the lowest 72-hole score of 272. He also rises to the No. 1 ranking on June 15, in only his 42nd week as a professional – the fastest ascent to the No. 1 ranking.
Men's amateur
 British Amateur – Craig Watson
 U.S. Amateur – Matt Kuchar
 European Amateur – Didier de Voogt
Women's professional
 Nabisco Dinah Shore – Betsy King
 LPGA Championship – Christa Johnson
 U.S. Women's Open – Alison Nicholas
 Classique du Maurier – Colleen Walker
 LPGA Tour money leader – Annika Sörenstam – $1,236,789

Handball
 World Men's Handball Championship – won by Russia
 World Women's Handball Championship – won by Denmark

Harness racing
 North America Cup – Gothic Dream
 Western Dreamer won the United States Pacing Triple Crown races –
 Cane Pace – Western Dreamer
 Little Brown Jug – Western Dreamer
 Messenger Stakes – Western Dreamer
 United States Trotting Triple Crown races –
 Hambletonian – Malabar Man
 Yonkers Trot – Lord Stormont
 Kentucky Futurity – Take Chances
 Australian Inter Dominion Harness Racing Championship –
 Pacers: Our Sir Vancelot
 Trotters: Pride Of Petite

Horse racing
 The Grand National Saturday meeting was abandoned after two coded bomb threats were received, causing evacuation of the course. The race was eventually run on the following Monday.
Steeplechases
 Cheltenham Gold Cup – Mr Mulligan
 Grand National – Lord Gyllene
Flat races
 Australia  – Melbourne Cup won by Might And Power
 Canada – Queen's Plate won by Awesome Again
 Dubai – Dubai World Cup won by Singspiel	
 France – Prix de l'Arc de Triomphe won by Peintre Célèbre
 Ireland – Irish Derby Stakes won by Desert King
 Japan – Japan Cup won by Pilsudski
 English Triple Crown races:
 2,000 Guineas Stakes –  Entrepreneur
 The Derby – Benny the Dip
 St. Leger Stakes – Silver Patriarch
 United States Triple Crown races:
 Kentucky Derby – Silver Charm
 Preakness Stakes – Silver Charm
 Belmont Stakes – Touch Gold
 Breeders' Cup World Thoroughbred Championships:
 Breeders' Cup Classic – Skip Away
 Breeders' Cup Distaff – Ajina
 Breeders' Cup Juvenile – Favorite Trick
 Breeders' Cup Juvenile Fillies – Countess Diana
 Breeders' Cup Mile – Spinning World
 Breeders' Cup Sprint – Elmhurst
 Breeders' Cup Turf – Chief Bearhart

Ice hockey
 Art Ross Trophy as the NHL's leading scorer during the regular season: Mario Lemieux, Pittsburgh Penguins
 Hart Memorial Trophy for the NHL's Most Valuable Player: Dominik Hašek of the Buffalo Sabres
 Stanley Cup – Detroit Red Wings win 4 games to 0 over the Philadelphia Flyers
 World Hockey Championship
 Men's champion: Canada defeated Sweden
 Junior Men's champion: Finland defeated	Russia
 Women's champion: Canada defeated the United States

Lacrosse
 The Rochester Knighthawks defeat the Buffalo Bandits 15–12 to win the Major Indoor Lacrosse League championship
 The National Lacrosse League (NLL) is formed from the Major Indoor Lacrosse League (MILL), with the decision to move from league ownership of all teams to individual team ownership.
 Mann Cup for the Canadian box lacrosse championship: Victoria Shamrocks of the Western Lacrosse Association
 European Lacrosse Championships –
 Men's champion: England defeats the Czech Republic
 Women's champion: England defeats Wales

Mixed martial arts
The following is a list of major noteworthy MMA events during 1997 in chronological order.

|-
|align=center style="border-style: none none solid solid; background: #e3e3e3"|Date
|align=center style="border-style: none none solid solid; background: #e3e3e3"|Event
|align=center style="border-style: none none solid solid; background: #e3e3e3"|Alternate Name/s
|align=center style="border-style: none none solid solid; background: #e3e3e3"|Location
|align=center style="border-style: none none solid solid; background: #e3e3e3"|Attendance
|align=center style="border-style: none none solid solid; background: #e3e3e3"|PPV Buyrate
|align=center style="border-style: none none solid solid; background: #e3e3e3"|Notes
|-align=center
|February 7
|UFC 12: Judgement Day
|
| Dothan, Alabama, United States
|3,100
|
|
|-align=center
|May 30
|UFC 13: Ultimate Force
|
| Augusta, Georgia, United States
|5,100
|
|
|-align=center
|July 27
|UFC 14: Showdown
|
|  Birmingham, Alabama, United States
|5,000
|
|
|-align=center
|October 11
|Pride 1
|
| Tokyo, Japan
|47,860
|
|
|-align=center
|October 17
|UFC 15: Collision Course
|
| Bay St. Louis, Mississippi, United States
|
|
|
|-align=center
|December 21
|UFC Japan: Ultimate Japan
|UFC 15.5
| Yokohama, Japan
|5,000
|
|
|-align=center

Motorsport

Radiosport
 Eighth Amateur Radio Direction Finding World Championship held in Sankt Englmar, Germany.
 Second High Speed Telegraphy World Championship held in Sofia, Bulgaria.

Rowing
 McGill University Rowing Club wins the inaugural McGill-Queen's Challenge Boat Race.

Rugby league

1 March – Townsville, Australia: The Adelaide Rams play their inaugural game, a loss to the North Queensland Cowboys 24–16 at Dairy Farmers Stadium before a crowd of 17,738.
2 March – Newcastle, Australia: The Hunter Mariners club plays its inaugural game, a 20–16 loss to the Canterbury-Bankstown Bulldogs at Topper Stadium before a crowd of 6,579.
18 May – Auckland, New Zealand: In the 1997 Oceania Cup's final New Zealand XIII defeat New Zealand Māori 20 – 15 at Carlaw Park.
19 May – Brisbane, Australia: In the final of the only Super League Tri-series to be played, New South Wales defeat Queensland 23–22 at ANZ Stadium before a crowd of 35,570. It sets a new record as the longest game of rugby league ever played before being decided by a field goal during extra time.
11 June – Melbourne, Australia: The 1997 State of Origin series is wrapped up in Game II by New South Wales who defeat Queensland 15–14 at the Melbourne Cricket Ground before a crowd of 25,105.
The 1997–98 French Championship season finishes with the Villeneuve Leopards on top of the league table.
20 September – Brisbane, Australia: The 1997 Super League (Australia) season's Grand Final is won by the Brisbane Broncos who defeated the Cronulla-Sutherland Sharks 26–8 at ANZ Stadium before a crowd of 58,912.
28 September – Sydney, Australia: The 1997 ARL season's grand final is won by the Newcastle Knights who defeated the Manly-Warringah Sea Eagles 22–16 at the Sydney Football Stadium before a crowd of 42,482.
12 October – Christchurch, New Zealand: The 1997 New Zealand season culminates in the Waikato Cougars	34–18 victory over the Canterbury Reds at Rugby League Park, Waikato defeated Canterbury 34–18 to win both the Challenge Cup and the Rugby League Cup.
18 October – Auckland, New Zealand: In the 1997 World Club Championship's final, the Brisbane Broncos defeat the Hunter Mariners 36–12 at Ericsson Stadium before a crowd of 12,000.
In the Super League II, on Sunday 28 September, with the final of the Premiership was won by Wigan Warriors who defeated St. Helens 33–20. At the end of the season Bradford Bulls were crowned League champions by virtue of finishing the season at the top of the table.
16 November – Leeds, England: In the third and deciding test match of the Super League Test series, Australia defeat Great Britain 37–20 at Elland Road before a crowd of 39,337.

Rugby union
 103rd Five Nations Championship series is won by France who complete the Grand Slam

Snooker
 World Snooker Championship – Ken Doherty beats Stephen Hendry 18–12
 World rankings – Stephen Hendry remains world number one for 1997/98

Swimming
 March 28 – Japan's Ayari Aoyama breaks Misty Hyman's world record in the Women's 100m Butterfly (short course): 58:24
 Third World Short Course Championships, held in Gothenburg, Sweden (April 17 – 20)
 April 19 – U.S.–swimmer Jenny Thompson breaks Ayari Aoyama's world record in the Women's 100m Butterfly (short course): 57:79
 April 20 – Australia wins the most medals (17), and the most gold medals (9)
 23rd European LC Championships, held in Seville, Spain (August 19 – 24)
 Germany wins the most medals (19), and the most gold medals (8)
 XIX Summer Universiade, held on Sicily, Italy (August 24 – 30)

Taekwondo
 World Championships held in Hong Kong

Tennis
 Grand Slam in tennis men's results:
 Australian Open – Pete Sampras
 French Open – Gustavo Kuerten
 Wimbledon championships – Pete Sampras
 U.S. Open – Patrick Rafter
 Grand Slam in tennis women's results:
 Australian Open – Martina Hingis
 French Open – Iva Majoli
 Wimbledon championships – Martina Hingis
 U.S. Open – Martina Hingis
 Davis Cup – Sweden won 5–0 over the United States in world tennis.

Volleyball
 Men's World League: Italy
 Women's World Grand Prix: Russia
 Men's European Championship: Netherlands
 Women's European Championship: Russia

Water polo
 Men's World Cup: USA
 Men's European Championship: Hungary
 Women's European Championship: Italy

Multi-sport events
 Second East Asian Games held in Busan, South Korea
 8th Pan Arab Games held in Beirut, Lebanon
 Fifth World Games held in Lahti, Finland
 13th Mediterranean Games held in Bari, Italy
 19th Summer Universiade held on Sicily, Italy
 19th SEA Games held on Jakarta, Indonesia
 18th Winter Universiade held in Muju County, South Korea

Awards
 Associated Press Male Athlete of the Year – Tiger Woods, PGA golf
 Associated Press Female Athlete of the Year – Martina Hingis, Tennis

References

 
Sports by year